Per Kristoffersen (12 October 1937 – 2 March 2023) was a Norwegian footballer who played as a forward for Fredrikstad and the Norway national team.

Career
Born in Fredrikstad, Kristoffersen became league champion three times and won the Norwegian Cup four times with Fredrikstad FK. He became top scorer in the Norwegian top flight four times. He was capped 25 times and scored 6 international goals for the Norway national team.

References

External links

1937 births
2023 deaths
Sportspeople from Fredrikstad
Norwegian footballers
Association football forwards
Norway international footballers
Norway youth international footballers
Eliteserien players
Fredrikstad FK players
Norway under-21 international footballers
20th-century Norwegian people